Kris Van De Putte (born 22 December 1975) is a Belgian football goalkeeper.

References

1975 births
Living people
Belgian footballers
K.V. Oostende players
K.S.K. Beveren players
R.W.D. Molenbeek players
R.A.E.C. Mons players
Belgian Pro League players
Association football goalkeepers